[[File:Francisco de Goya, Que viene el coco (Here Comes the Bogey-Man), published 1799, NGA 7459.jpg|thumb|Goya's Que viene el Coco' ("Here Comes the Boogeyman / The Boogeyman is Coming"), c. 1797]]
The Bogeyman (also spelled boogeyman, bogyman, bogieman, boogie monster, boogieman, or boogie woogie) is a type of mythic creature used by adults to frighten children into good behavior. Bogeymen have no specific appearance and conceptions vary drastically by household and culture, but they are most commonly depicted as masculine or androgynous monsters that punish children for misbehavior. The Bogeyman or conceptually similar monsters can be found in many cultures around the world. Bogeymen may target a specific act or general misbehaviour, depending on what purpose needs serving, often on the basis of a warning from the child's authority figure. The term is sometimes used as a non-specific personification or metonym for terror, and in some cases, the Devil.

Etymology
The word bogey originated in the mid-19th century, originally as a quasi-proper name for the devil. It may derive from the Middle English bogge or bugge, meaning  a terror or scarecrow. It relates to bugbear (from bug, meaning goblin or scarecrow, and bear) an imaginary demon in the form of a bear that ate small children. It was also used to mean a general object of dread. The word bugaboo, with a similar pair of meanings, may have arisen as an alteration of bugbear.

The word is known in Indo-European languages as puck (English), bogle (Scots), púca, pooka or pookha (Irish), pwca, bwga or bwgan (Welsh), bucca (Cornish), buse or busemann (Norwegian), puki (Old Norse), bøhmand or bussemand (Danish), bûzeman (Western Frisian), boeman (Dutch), Butzemann (German), bòcan, bogu (Slavonic), buka or Babay/Babayka (Russian, бука), bauk (Serbian), bubulis (Latvian), baubas (Lithuanian), bobo (Polish), bubák (Czech), bubák (Slovak), bebok (Silesian), papão (Portuguese), babulas, bua (Georgian, ბუა), babau (Italian), Бабай (Ukrainian), baubau (Romanian), and papu (Catalan). In Hungarian, a Uralic language, bogeyman is mumus.

Physical description and personality
While the description of the Bogeyman differs on a cultural level, there are often some shared similarities to the creatures. Many of the Bogeymen are depicted as having claws, talons, and sharp teeth. Along with that, the majority of Bogeymen are of the spirit variety, while the minority are demons, witches, and other legendary creatures. Some are even described to have certain animal features such as horns, hooves, and bug like appearances.

When looking at the personality traits of the Bogeymen, they are most easily divided into three categories; the kind that punishes misbehaved children, the kind that are more prone to violence, and the kind that protect the innocent. They all relate in the same way, being that they all exist to teach young children lessons. The large majority of Bogeymen are there to just frighten children with punishments, and not actually inflict much damage. The more vicious Bogeyman is said to steal the children at night, and even eat them, or another example of violence. The last category is the Bogeyman who protects people and only punishes those guilty, regardless of age.

Other putative origins
Because of the myth’s worldwide prevalence, it is difficult to find the original source of the legends. The Bogeyman was first referenced for the hobgoblins described in the 16th century England. Many believed that they were made to torment humans, and while some only played simple pranks, others were more foul in nature.

Analogues in other cultures
Bogeyman-like beings are almost universal, common to the folklore of many countries.

Sack Man

In many countries, a bogeyman variant is portrayed as a man with a sack on his back who carries naughty children away. Similar legends are also very common in Eastern Europe (e.g. Bulgarian , "sack man"), as well as in Haiti and some countries in Asia.

El Coco

The  (or Cucafera) monster is the equivalent in certain parts of Catalonia.

In Spain, parents will sing lullabies or tell rhymes to children, warning them that if they do not sleep,  will come to get them. The rhyme originated in the 17th century and has evolved over the years, but still retains its original meaning. Coconuts received that name because the hairy, brown "face" created by the coconut shell's three indentations reminded the Portuguese sailors of "Coco".

Latin America also has , although its folklore is usually quite different, commonly mixed with native beliefs, and, because of cultural contacts, sometimes more related to the boogeyman of the United States. However, the term  is also used in Spanish-speaking Latin American countries, such as Bolivia, Colombia, Guatemala, Peru, Mexico, El Salvador, Honduras, and Venezuela, although there it is more usually called , as in Puerto Rico, the Dominican Republic, Chile, Uruguay, Panama and Argentina. Among Mexican-Americans,  is portrayed as an evil monster that hides under children's beds at night and kidnaps or eats the child that does not obey his/her parents or go to sleep when it is time to do so. However, the Spanish American bogeyman does not resemble the shapeless or hairy monster of Spain: social sciences professor Manuel Medrano says popular legend describes  as a small humanoid with glowing red eyes that hides in closets or under the bed. "Some lore has him as a kid who was the victim of violence... and now he's alive, but he's not," Medrano said, citing Xavier Garza's 2004 book Creepy Creatures and other Cucuys."

A Cuca

In Brazilian folklore, a similar character called Cuca is depicted as a female humanoid alligator, or an old lady with a sack. There is a famous lullaby sung by many parents to their children that says that the Cuca will come to get them and make a soup or soap out of them if they do not sleep, just as in Spain. The Cuca is also a character of Monteiro Lobato's Sítio do Picapau Amarelo ("Yellow Woodpecker's Farm"), an acclaimed and creative series of short novels written for children which contain a large number of famous characters from Brazilian folklore.

Babau

In the countries of central and Eastern Mediterranean, children who misbehave are threatened with a creature known as "babau" (or "baubau", "baobao", "bavbav", or "بعبع (Bu'Bu'" or similar). In Italy, the Babau is also called l'uomo nero or "black man". In Italy, he is portrayed as a tall man wearing a heavy black coat, with a black hood or hat which hides his face. Sometimes, parents will knock loudly under the table, pretending that someone is knocking at the door, and say something like: "Here comes l'uomo nero! He must know that there's a child here who doesn't want to drink his soup!". It is also featured in a widespread nursery rhyme in Italy: "Ninna nanna, ninna oh, questo bimbo a chi lo do? Lo darò all' uomo nero, che lo tiene un anno intero." (English: "Lullaby Lulla Oh, who do I give this child to? I will give him to the Boogeyman, who's going to keep him for a whole year")  L'uomo nero is not supposed to eat or harm children, but instead takes them away to a mysterious and frightening place.

Butzemann
Germanic folklore has dozens of different figures that correspond to the Bogeyman. These have various appearances (such as of a gnome, man, animal, monster, ghost or devil). They are sometimes said to appear at very specific places (such as in forests, at water bodies, cliffs, cornfields or vineyards). These figures are called by many different names which are often only regionally known. One of these, possibly etymologically related to the Bogeyman, is the Butzemann, which can be of gnome-like or other demonic or ghostly appearance. Other examples include the Buhmann (who is mostly proverbial) and der schwarze Mann ("The Black Man"), an inhuman creature which hides in the dark corners under the bed or in the closet and carries children away. The figure is part of the children's game Wer hat Angst vorm schwarzen Mann?" ("Who is afraid of the bogeyman?").

Other examples
 Afghanistan – The Madar-i-Al is a nocturnal hag that slaughters infants in their cribs and is invoked to frighten children into obedience. Burning wild rue seeds and fumigating the area around the baby will offer protection against her.
 Albania:
 The Buba is a serpentine monster. Mothers would tell their children to be quiet or the Buba would get them.
 The Gogol is a terrible giant that frightens children into being good.
 The Lubia is a female demon with an insatiable appetite for the flesh of children, especially girls. She has many heads, from seven to a hundred, and like the Greek hydra if one head is severed then others will grow in its place.
 Azerbaijan – The Div is a hairy giant that eats children. It was outsmarted and defeated by a clever young boy named Jirtdan, a popular hero in Azerbaijani fairy tales.
 Belize – Tata Duende is a mythical goblin described as being of small stature, with a beard, wrinkles, backwards feet, a large brimmed hat, and lacking thumbs. It is a protector of the forests and animals and was used to scare children from going out to play at night or going into the jungle.
 Bosnia and Herzegovina, Croatia, Serbia and North Macedonia – Babaroga (a South Slavic variant of Baba Yaga; baba meaning hag and rog meaning horn, thus literally meaning horned hag) is commonly attributed the characteristics of the bogeyman. The details vary regionally and by household due to oral tradition, but it always manifests as a menacing hag who hunts irreverent children. It is described as fond of trapping and eating caught children.
 Brazil and Portugal – A monster more akin to the Bogeyman is called Bicho Papão ("Eating Beast") or Sarronco ("Deep-Voiced Man"). A notable difference between it and the homem do saco is that the latter is a daytime menace and "Bicho Papão" is a nighttime menace. Another important difference is that "Homem do Saco" ("Sack Man") usually kidnaps children who go to places without parents authorization, while "Bicho Papão" scares naughty children and hides under their beds, closets or roofs.
 In Inuit mythology, there is a shapeshifting creature called the Ijiraq, that kidnaps children, to hide them away and abandon them. If the children can convince the Ijiraq to let them go, they can use inukshuk of stone to find their way home. Also from Inuit Mythology there is the Qalupalik, which are human-like creatures with long fingernails, green skin, and long hair that live in the sea. They carry babies and children away in their Amauti, if they disobey their parents and wander off alone. The Qalupalik adopt the children and bring them to live with them underwater.
 Canada – In Quebec and French Canada the Bogeyman is called  'The Seven o'Clock Man'. Children are warned to go to bed by 7 o'clock (7 heure), lest Mister Seven O'Clock will come to catch them.
 Cyprus – In the Cypriot dialect, the Bogeyman is called Kkullas (Κκουλλάς);  a man (vaguely described as hooded and/or deformed) who will put misbehaving children in a bag and take them away from their homes.
 Czech Republic – The equivalent of the Bogeyman in the Czech Republic is bubák (≈ imp) or strašidlo (≈ ghost), but these are not typically connected with abducting children nor with discriminating between well and bad behaved ones. This is more often attributed to polednice and klekánice (Lady midday, or Lady evening), or to the čert (Krampus, or lit. devil) who, along with st. Nicholas and angel, traditionally visits families on December 5.
 Egypt – The "Abu Rigl Maslukha" (ابو رجل مسلوخة), which translates to the "Man With Burnt/Skinned Leg". It is a very scary story that parents tell their children when they misbehave. The "Abu Rigl Maslukha" is a monster that got burnt when he was a child because he did not listen to his parents. He grabs naughty children to cook and eat them.
 England:
 In East Yorkshire, children were warned that if they stole from orchards they might be eaten by a goblin or demon called Awd Goggie.
 Yorkshire children were also warned that if they were naughty the Great Black Bird would come and carry them away. 
 In Devon, local variations of Spring-Heeled Jack included a "bogeyman" that "danced in the road and leapt over hedges with the greatest of ease", with reported sightings in North Devon and locals describing "haunted" stretches of road in the South Devon towns of St Marychurch and Torquay, beginning in the 1840s.
 The Gooseberry Wife was said to guard gooseberry bushes on the Isle of Wight and took the form of a large hairy caterpillar. 
 Churnmilk Peg in West Yorkshire was a female goblin who guarded nut thickets until they could be harvested and would always be seen smoking a pipe. Melsh Dick was her male counterpart and performed the same function.
 Tom Dockin had iron teeth that he used to devour bad children.
 Black Annis was a hag with a blue face and iron claws who lived in a cave in the Dane Hills of Leicestershire. She ventured forth at night in search of children to devour.The Folklore Society (1895). County Folk-Lore (Vol. 1). "Leicestershire and Rutland" (Charles James Billson, ed.). pp. 4–9, 76–77.
 Grindylow, Jenny Greenteeth and Nelly Longarms were grotesque hags who lived in ponds and rivers and dragged children beneath the water if they got too close.
 Peg Powler is a hag who inhabits the River Tees.
 Other nursery bogies include Mumpoker, Tankerabogus who drags children into his deep, dark pit and Tom-Poker who lives in dark closets and holes under stairs.
 Finland – The equivalent of the Bogeyman in Finland is mörkö, often depicted as a dark and hairy creature that may or may not be humanoid. The most famous usage of the word these days takes place in Moomin-stories (originally written in Swedish) in which mörkö (the Groke) is a large, frightening, dark blue, ghost-like creature. The children's game "Kuka pelkää Mustaa Pekkaa?" ("Who's Afraid of Black Peter?") was also commonly played among children through to the 1960s and '70s, especially in urban settings, as a backyard game (see Germany's "Wer hat Angst vorm schwarzen Mann?").
 France – The French equivalent of the Bogeyman is le croque-mitaine ("the mitten-biter" or rather "the hand-cruncher"—mitaine means mitt in an informal way).

 Germany – The Bogeyman is known as Der schwarze Mann ("the Black Man"). "Schwarz" does not refer to the color of his skin, but to his preference for hiding in dark places, like the closet, under the beds of children, or in forests at night. There is also an active game for little children which is called Wer hat Angst vorm schwarzen Mann? ("Who is afraid of the Black Man?"), and an old traditional folk song Es tanzt ein Bi-Ba-Butzemann in unserm Haus herum ("A Bi-Ba-Bogeyman Dances Around in Our House").
 Greece – In Greek, the common translation of "Bogeyman" is "Baboulas"), which is pronounced babʊlas. It is used by the parents to scare their children so they will not misbehave. This creature is supposed to be some kind of cannibal that eats the children. The most used phrase about the creature is "", which means "The Bogeyman will come and eat you".
Haiti – In Haiti the Boogeyman is known as Mètminwi (The Master of Midnight) it is depicted as a very skinny two story tall man who walks around late at night and eats anyone left on the streets. This story is told to the Haitian children to deter them from going out late at night.
Hungary – The Hungarian equivalent of the Bogeyman is the Mumus, which is a monster-like creature, and the Zsákos Ember, a man with a sack, which is the literal meaning of his name. A third creature is the Rézfaszú bagoly ("Copperpenis Owl"), a giant owl with a copper penis.
 Iceland – The Icelandic equivalent of the Bogeyman is Grýla, a female troll who would take misbehaving children and eat them during Christmas Eve. However, as the story goes, she has been dead for some time. She is also the mother of the Yule Lads, the Icelandic equivalent of Santa Claus.
 India – In India, the entity is known by different names. Urdu speaking population refer to the bogeyman-like creature by names such as Shaitan/Shaytaan, Bhoot, Jin Baba, which mean satan, ghost, Djinn respectively. Hindi speaking population refer to the bogeyman-like creature as Baba and Bhoot. Bihar  – Parents use the demon name Bhakolwa for this purpose. The terms Petona and Kaatu are also used. In Rajasthan, parents use the demon name Haboo to terrify their children. South India – In Karnataka, the demon "Goggayya" (roughly meaning 'terrible man') can be treated as counterpart of the bogeyman. In the state of Tamil Nadu, children are often mock-threatened with the Rettai Kannan (the two-eyed one) or Poochaandi (பூச்சாண்டி), a monster or fearsome man with whom children are sometimes threatened if they are not obedient or refuse to eat. In the state of Andhra Pradesh, the equivalent of the bogeyman is Boochodu. In central Kerala, the bogeyman is referred to as "Kokkachi", who will "take away" children for disobeying their parents or misbehaving in any manner; and in South Kerala, the bogeyman is called "Oochandi". Among Konkani-speaking people of the Western Coast of India, "Gongo" is the Bogeyman equivalent. Among Marathi language speaking people (predominantly of Maharashtra), parents threaten the misbehaving children with a male ghost called "Bāgul Buā" (बागुल बुवा). In general, the "Buā" is supposed to kidnap children when they misbehave or do not sleep. In the eastern state of Odisha the bogeyman is referred to as "Baaya"(ବାୟା). Its usage is usually done to scare kids into following instructions of the elders. The term "Baaya" also designates a ghost.
 Indonesia – In Indonesia, Wewe Gombel is a ghost that kidnaps children mistreated by their parents. She keeps the children in her nest atop an Arenga pinnata palm tree and does not harm them. She takes care of the children as a grandmother until the parents become aware of what they have done. If the parents decide to mend their ways and truly want their children back, Wewe Gombel will return them unharmed. This ghost is named Wewe Gombel because it originated in an event that took place in Bukit Gombel, Semarang.
 Iran - In Iran, a popular children's folklore creature known as "لولو خور خوره", Romanised "Lulu Khor Khoreh" is a creature of mysterious origin. Perception of it varies widely but its commonly known to come out at night and eat children who misbehave ( which is generally the refusal to eat food ) .
 Iraq's ancient folklore has the saalua, a half-witch half-demon ghoul that "is used by parents to scare naughty children". She is briefly mentioned in a tale of the 1001 Nights, and is known in some other Persian Gulf countries as well.
 Ireland - In Ireland, “An fear dubh” similar to Italian folklore.
 Italy – In Italy, "L'uomo nero" (meaning "the black man") is a demon that can appear as a black man or black ghost without legs, often used by adults for scaring their children when they do not want to sleep. In some parts of the country, it is known also as "babau".
 Marabbecca is a malevolent water monster from the mythology of Sicily that lived in wells and reservoirs and was said to come up and drag children that played too close down into the water to drown.
 Japan – In Japan, a popular culture is the "Kami-kakushi". This is a phenomenon, not a character. Author Yanagida Kunio created "Kotorizo", "Kakushi-baba", etc. as boogeyman-like characters.
 Lithuania – referred to as the Baubas, an evil spirit with long lean arms, wrinkly fingers, and red eyes. He harasses people by pulling their hair or stifling them.
 Luxembourg – De béise Monni (the evil uncle), De Kropemann (the hookman), De Bö, and de schwaarze Mann (the black man) are Luxembourg's equivalents of the Bogeyman. Luxembourg's many variations of the bogeyman may be the result of its strong cultural attachment to its neighbour countries due to the country's small size. The Kropemann lives in the sewer and uses his hook to catch children by the nose if they stand too close to a storm drain, drawing them down to him.  Parents warn their naughty children that the béise Monni alias Bö alias schwaarze Mann, will come to take them away if they don't behave.
 Malta – Kaw Kaw or Gaw Gaw, was a grey, slimy creature that roamed the streets at night. It could smell a person's guilt and enter their homes, through cracks and fissures, by extending and contracting its snail-like body. Once it was inside their rooms, it would flash them a ghastly grin, with its huge, toothless mouth, scaring them witless.

 Nepal – In Nepali, a popular bogeyman character is the 'hau-guji'. Among the Newars, the "Gurumapa" is a mythic ape-like creature who was supposed to enjoy devouring children. Itum Bahal of inner Kathmandu and the Tinkhya open space in front of the Bhadrakali temple in the centre of Kathmandu are associated with the fable of Gurumapa.
 Netherlands -  
The Bokkenrijders or “buck riders” are ghost thieves who ride flying goats.
 Pakistan – The Mamma is a large apelike creature that lives in the mountains and ventures forth to kidnap young girls. He will carry them back to his cave where he licks their palms and the soles of their feet which makes them permanently unable to flee.
 Panama – In Panama, children are warned that if they are naughty, La Tulivieja will come to get them. She was a spirit who was cursed by God for drowning her child, and transformed into a hideous monster with a pockmarked face, long and bristly hair, clawed hands, a cat's body, and hooved feet. She was also cursed to forever look for her drowned child.
 Poland – "Baba Jaga" is a witch living in the forest that kidnaps badly behaving children and presumably eats them. It is referred to in a children's game of the same name, which involves one child being blindfolded, and other children trying to avoid being caught.. In some regions(mainly in western Poland) a more common creature is Bebok/Bobok which is a small, annoying demon.
 Russia and Ukraine – Children are warned that Babay/Babayka,Russian boogeymen: How did parents scare their children? buka or Baba Yaga will come for them at night if they behave badly.
 Saudi Arabia – Abu Shalawlaw (أبو شلولو) is a Bogeyman-like creature said by parents to come to eat children who are disobedient, e.g., by not going to sleep on time or not completing their homework. 
 Hejaz, Saudi Arabia – أمنا الغولة والدوجيرة or "Dojairah and Umna al Ghola", which means "Our mother the Monster", is used to scare children when they misbehave or walk alone outside.
 Scotland:
 Misbehaving children were warned that a goblin or demon known as the bodach would come down the chimney and take them.Briggs (1976), p. 29.
 The each-uisge is the Scottish version of the water horse, a monster that lives in seas and lochs and usually takes the form of a horse. A cautionary tale tells how the each-uisge persuaded seven little girls to get on its back before carrying them into the water to be devoured.
 Serbia – Bauk is an animal-like mythic creature in Serbian folklore. Bauk is described as hiding in dark places, holes or abandoned houses, waiting to grab, carry away, and devour its victim; it can be scared away by light and noise.
 South Africa – The Tokoloshe or Tikoloshe is a dwarfish creature of Xhosa and Zulu mythology conjured up by sangomas (traditional healers). It wanders around causing mischief and frightening children. It is also described as a small, muscular, hairy witch-familiar with an unusually large penis. It may visit women in their dreams and sexually assault them.
 South Korea - The "Net Bag Grandfather" (Mangtae Hal-abeoji, 망태 할아버지) is an imaginary old man employed by adults to frighten children into obedience. It is said that he kidnaps spoiled, misbehaving children and takes them away to the mountains, where they are never seen again. See Sack Man.
 Spain
 Catalonia -  (lit. 'scare children' in Catalan/Valencian) is the general term for imaginary beings employed by adults to frighten children into obedience.
Some examples are: el , el , la ,  l'Home del sac (Sack Man), les  'the enchanted (women)', la Cuca Fera (cf. El Coco above), el  (or "Mussa the Moor"), la , els , and l'Home dels nassos.

 Switzerland – In Switzerland, the Bogeyman is called Böllima or Böögg (pron.) and has an important role in the springtime ceremonies. The figure is the symbol of winter and death, so in the Sechseläuten ceremony in the City of Zürich, a figure of the Böögg is burnt. In Southern Switzerland, people have the same traditions as in Italy.
 Taiwan – Among Minnan Taiwanese, Grandmother Tiger (虎姑婆 / Hóo-koo-pô) is a figure used to scare disobedient children.
 Trinidad and Tobago – Most Trinbagonians (mostly in the rural demograph) use folklore to scare disobedient children. The most common word that is used is Jumbie. Some "jumbies" are the Soucouyant, Lagahoo, La Diabless, Papa Bois, etc. "Bogeyman" is also used in the same context as its origin but by mostly urbanised citizens, and it can also can be called "The Babooman".
 Turkey – The Öcü is an equivalent monster in Turkish culture. Much like its English language counterpart, the form, powers, or even general temperament of the creature is undefined to the degree that it is unclear whether the word refers to a single being or a category or species of mythic creatures.
 United States – The Bogeyman may be called "Boogerman" or "Boogermonster" in rural areas of the American South ("booger" being an American English equivalent of the British English "bogey"), and was most often used to keep young children from playing outside past dark, or wandering off in the forest. During the Corn Festival, young Cherokee males wearing caricature masks would make fun of politicians, frighten children into being good, and shake their masks at young women and chase them around. Male participants in this "Booger Dance" were referred to as the "Booger Men". In some Midwestern states, the boogeyman scratches at the window. In Eastern Iowa, they have the Korn Stalker. In the Pacific Northwest, he may manifest in "green fog". In other places he hides or appears from under the bed or in the closet and tickles children when they go to sleep at night, while in others he is a tall figure in a black hooded cloak who puts children in a sack. It is said that a wart can be transmitted to someone by the boogeyman.
 The Jersey Devil, which originated in the Pine Barrens of New Jersey in the early 18th century, was originally described as having a horse's head, bat wings, cloven hooves, and a serpent's tail. Regarding the famous Jersey Devil sightings of 1909, Loren Coleman and Ivan T. Sanderson offered the explanation that they were part of an elaborate real estate hoax, used by developers as a boogeyman figure to frighten residents into selling their property at lower prices.
 Bloody Bones, also known as Rawhead or Tommy Rawhead, is a boogeyman of the American South. Rawhead and Bloody Bones are sometimes regarded as two individual creatures or two separate parts of the same monster. One is a bare skull that bites its victims and its companion is a dancing headless skeleton. Bloody Bones tales originated in Britain.
 The Nalusa Falaya ("Long Black Being") is a ghost being of Choctaw mythology described as a tall spindly humanoid that can slither like a snake or become a shadow. It may frighten children from staying out too late and can bewitch hunters.
 Cipelahq (or Chebelakw) is a dangerous bird spirit of Wabanaki folklore, used in stories to scare children into obeying their parents. Chebelakw has an unearthly cry and resembles a large diving owl, with only its head and talons visible. Similar monsters called Stinkini and Big Owl were found in Seminole and Apache mythologies, respectively.
 Vietnam - In Vietnam Ông Ba bị, Ông kẹ or Ngáo ộp'' is a scary creature that is often used by adults to scare children if they disobey. The Ông Ba bị is described as having nine straps and twelve eyes (Ba bị chín quai mười hai con mắt).

See also

 Albert Fish
 Baba Yaga
 Bhoot (ghost)
 Boggart
 Coco
 Companions of Saint Nicholas
 Erlkönig
 Ghoul
 Jack the Ripper
 Kappa (folklore)
 Krampus
 La Llorona
 Madam Koi Koi
 Nian
 Oogie Boogie
 Sack Man
 Shellycoat
 Spring-heeled Jack
 Slender Man
 Struwwelpeter
 Yama (Buddhism)
 Yara-ma-yha-who

References

 
American legendary creatures
English legendary creatures
European folklore characters
Legendary creatures in popular culture
Supernatural legends
Mythological monsters
Devils